A birthgasm is a female orgasm that occurs during childbirth. This is sometimes referred to as an "orgasmic childbirth." Some women use sexual stimulation to ease contractions, instead of anesthesia. More than 85% of midwives surveyed by Postel (2013) stated that a sexually pleasurable birth experience was possible, and 69% stated they had observed such a case.

References

Childbirth
Orgasm